Frederick Earl "Red" Seick (April 29, 1911 – October 31, 1989) was a professional American football Guard who played in 1942 with the New York Giants. He also played for the old American Football League's Boston Shamrocks in 1936.

External links
Pro-Football-Reference

1911 births
1989 deaths
American football offensive guards
Boston Shamrocks (AFL) players
Manhattan Jaspers football players
New York Giants players
People from Lewiston, New York